Spooky Hooky is a 1936 Our Gang short comedy film directed by Gordon Douglas. It was the 149th Our Gang (61st talking episode) short that was released.

Plot
When Alfalfa, Spanky, Buckwheat and Porky become bored with school, they decide to fake an illness for the next day and leave a note on their teacher Miss Lawrence's desk so that they can go to the circus, which they had just seen arrive in town. However, when Miss Lawrence reveals that she plans on taking the class to the circus the next day, Spanky tries to hurry back to the school to retrieve the note, but Porky and Buckwheat return and lock the door behind them before Spanky is able to make it to the door. Now with no way to get back in the school, the boys decide to sneak into the school later that night to recover the note. What follows is a series of scared chaos that the boys and the school's janitor encounter.

The boys do succeed in recovering the note; however, in the final scene, each of the four boys are shown in a four-way split-screen taking a cold medicine the next morning as their mothers declare in unison, "For the last time, you can't go to school today," indicating that the disappointed boys are now really sick and cannot go to school on the day of the circus.

Cast

The Gang
 George McFarland as Spanky
 Carl Switzer as Alfalfa
 Billie Thomas as Buckwheat
 Eugene Lee as Porky

Additional cast
 Dudley Dickerson as Sam, the janitor
 Rosina Lawrence as Miss Lawrence
 Laughing Gravy as himself

Schoolyard extras
Patsy Barry, John Collum, Paul Hilton, Sidney Kibrick, Jackie Lindquist, Dickie De Nuet, Donald Proffitt, Harold Switzer, Robert Winckler

See also
 Our Gang filmography

References

External links

1936 films
American black-and-white films
1936 comedy films
Films directed by Gordon Douglas
Metro-Goldwyn-Mayer short films
1936 short films
Our Gang films
1930s American films